The Here After is a 2015 Swedish drama film written and directed by Magnus von Horn. The film is a co-production between Sweden, Poland and France. It was screened in the Directors' Fortnight section at the 2015 Cannes Film Festival. The film won the Guldbagge Award for Best Film, Best Director for Magnus von Horn and Best Supporting Actor for Mats Blomgren at the 51st Guldbagge Awards.

Cast
 Ulrik Munther as John
 Mats Blomgren as Martin
 Wiesław Komasa as Grandfather 
 Alexander Nordgren as Filip
 Loa Ek as Malin
 Ellen Jelinek as Bea
 Feliv Göransson as Korv-Hampus

Reception
The Here After received positive reviews from critics. On Rotten Tomatoes, the film has an 88% score based on 16 reviews, with an average rating of 6.4/10.

References

External links
 
 

2015 films
2010s Swedish-language films
Swedish drama films
French drama films
Polish drama films
Best Film Guldbagge Award winners
Films whose director won the Best Director Guldbagge Award
2015 directorial debut films
2015 drama films
Films directed by Magnus von Horn
2010s Swedish films
2010s French films